The "Schistes bitumineux" (French for Oil shale/Bituminous shale) is an Early Jurassic geologic formation in Luxembourg that is located within an oil shale, hence the name. The machimosaurid teleosauroid Macrospondylus bollensis is known from this formation. This formation may be part of the larger Posidonia Shale, which also outcrops in Luxembourg, among other countries.

References

Mesozoic Erathem of Europe
Jurassic System of Europe
Shale formations
Open marine deposits
Fossiliferous stratigraphic units of Europe